Lindóia do Sul is a municipality in the state of Santa Catarina in the South region of Brazil.

See also
List of municipalities in Santa Catarina

References

Municipalities in Santa Catarina (state)
Portuguese words affected by the 1990 spelling reform